Claudia Butenuth (September 20, 1946 - September 1, 2016) was a German film and television actress.

Filmography

References

Bibliography
 Sweeney, Kevin. James Mason: A Bio-bibliography. Greenwood Publishing Group, 1999.

External links

1946 births
Living people
German television actresses
German film actresses